The Donovan Creek Estuary lies on the Quilcene bay on the coast of Jefferson County, Washington in north-west Washington state on the Olympic Peninsula.

Protected area
The Hood Canal Salmon Enhancement Group partnered with the JCCD, Jefferson Co., local property owners and the Washington Department of Fish and Wildlife to design, construct and manage the Donovan Creek Estuary restoration.  The project permanently protects and restored 76 acres of the lower Donovan Creek coastal ecosystem in the upper Quilcene Bay.

Species
Primary Species Benefiting
 Chum salmon
Secondary Species Benefiting
Bull trout
Chinook salmon
Coho salmon
Coastal cutthroat trout
River lamprey
 Steelhead
 Other Wildlife

See also
Hood Canal
Quilcene, Washington
Big Quilcene Estuary
Big Quilcene River
Little Quilcene Estuary
Little Quilcene River
Olympic Peninsula

References

External links
Jefferson Land Trust

Nature reserves in Washington (state)
Bays of Washington (state)
Estuaries of Washington (state)
Protected areas of Jefferson County, Washington
Bodies of water of Jefferson County, Washington
Bays of Jefferson County, Washington